Gaz Khun (also Romanized as Gaz Khūn and Gazkhūn; also known as Gas Khūn) is a village in Bord Khun Rural District, Bord Khun District, Deyr County, Bushehr Province, Iran. At the 2006 census, its population was 24, in 4 families.

References 

Populated places in Deyr County